Green Bay is an unincorporated community in Prince Edward County, Virginia, United States located on US Highway 360 between Burkeville Virginia and Keysville Virginia. Peach growing in the area was very successful during the 1930s and 1940s, but finally succumbed to the advancement of larger growers and the change in technique and labor availabilities. Rail access was a mainline by Norfolk and Western Railway and also the Southern Railway which have merged to form Norfolk Southern.

Twin Lakes State Park is located close to Green Bay. Formerly the racially-segregated Goodwin Lake and Prince Edward Lake, the two parks merged in 1976 and adopted the current name in 1986.

References

Unincorporated communities in Virginia
Unincorporated communities in Prince Edward County, Virginia